Micromax Informatics is an Indian multinational manufacturer of consumer electronics and home appliances, headquartered in Gurugram. It was established in March 2000 as an IT software company operating in the embedded devices domain. It entered the mobile handset business in 2008 and, by 2010, became one of the largest companies making low-cost feature phones in India.

In 2014, Micromax was the tenth largest smartphone vendor in the world. In the subsequent years, the company faced stiff competition from Chinese companies that began penetrating the Indian market. The company also owns YU Televentures, which sells the products under the brand name YU.

History
Micromax was incorporated as Micromax Informatics Ltd. in the year 2000 by Rahul Sharma and Rohit Patel. It began selling mobile phones in 2008, focusing on democratising technology for masses to compete with international players.

The company has also introduced handsets (budget and flagship) with innovative features. For instance, Micromax's co-founder Rahul Sharma once saw a public call office being powered by a truck battery because of frequent power cuts in its locale. This prompted him to launch a feature mobile phone with a long battery life. This was the X1i phone, Micromax's first telephone with a month-long battery back-up.

In 2014, Micromax's sales in India exceeded those of Samsung. It became the mobile telephone reseller to ship the most telephones in one quarter in India. On 24 January 2014, Micromax became the first Indian mobile company to sell in Russia. In 2020, Micromax made a comeback in the Indian mobile industry with a new sub-brand "IN".

Segments

Mobile handsets 
Feature phones 
Smartphones

Consumer Electronics 
Televisions 
Air Conditioners
Refrigerators 
Washing Machines
Known for mobile handsets and LED TV panels, Micromax is also expanding its portfolio in the consumer electronics segment, targeting the "premium economy" consumers.

Products

Funbook series
Micromax entered the tablet computer market with the debut of the Funbook series.

Funbook Pro (HD display, finger print sensor) with Snapdragon processor & 1GB RAM, runs Android One

Canvas Knight A350 and Canvas A1

Micromax launched its first eight-core flagship smartphone, Canvas Knight A350, in March 2014 for the Russian market. In the same year on September, Micromax launched the Android One smartphone, Canvas A1.

Canvas Silver 5, Canvas Win W092 and Canvas Win W121

Micromax launched Micromax Canvas Sliver 5, which it claimed was the slimmest telephone in the world on 17 June 2015. The company is an official Windows Phone 8.1 hardware partner. In June 2014, it launched two Windows smartphones, the Micromax Canvas Win W092 and the Micromax Canvas Win W121.

Canvas Amaze 2

On 8 June 2015, Micromax announced the launch of Micromax Amaze 2. The device has a 5-inch IPS display with resolution of 1280 x 720 pixels. The smartphone is powered by a 1.4 GHz quad-core Snapdragon processor with 2 GB of RAM and 16 GB of internal storage.

Canvas Unite 4 and Canvas Unite 4 Pro
A year later, Micromax announced the launch of Micromax Canvas Unite 4 and Canvas Unite 4 Pro. Both these smartphones run on Indus OS 2.0. The Canvas Unite 4 is powered by a 1.0 GHz quad-core processor with 1 GB RAM. The Micromax Canvas Unite 4 Pro had more powerful specifications, featuring a 1.3 GHz quad-core processor with 2 GB RAM.

Canvas Mega 2
In 2016, Micromax Canvas Mega 2 was launched and shipped.

Bharat series
Micromax has rolled out basic smartphones with 4G capabilities under the Bharat series. So far, the company has already launched Bharat 2 - which is considered one of India's cheapest 4G mobile phones.

Dual 4 & Dual 5
Micromax has announced the entry of Micromax Dual 5 and Micromax Dual 4 in India.

Canvas Infinity
Later in August 2017, Micromax launched its first bezel-less smartphone with an aspect ratio of 18:9. This device called Canvas Infinity still fell within the budget category.

Infinity N11 

Micromax Infinity N11 smartphone was launched in December 2018.

YU ACE TV 
Following the latest 18:9 trend, the smartphone features a 5.4-inch HD+ Full View display with the screen resolution of 720 pixels. Powered by a 1.5 GHz quad-core MediaTek 6739 processor, the device runs on the latest Android Oreo operating system. Furthermore, backed up by 2 GB RAM + 16 GB internal storage, the handset will later be launched in 3 GB RAM + 32 GB storage variants as well.

Canvas 3 TV 
Running Android Nougat OS, Micromax Canvas 3 allows media sharing and wireless smartphone control. The TV comes in different screen sizes: 32-inch, 40-inch and 50-inch.

IN Series 
Micromax launched its IN Series on 2020 with the introduction of two models IN 1B and IN Note 1. They promised two years of Android Security Updates and assured to always use Clean Stock Android in this Series.

Manufacturing in India

Products manufactured 
Mobile phones, LED TVs, LED lights and Tablets. The Government would be providing land to Micromax for setting up the centre, which has a capacity to produce 10 lakh devices a month, which include mobile phones, LED TVs, LED lights and Tablets. It presently employs 700 people. The firm's first facility in Uttarakhand has a capacity to produce 16 lakh devices.

Manufacturing hubs 
Micromax have three factories - Bhiwadi (Rajasthan), Rudrapur (Uttarakhand) and Telangana. In Bhiwadi, the SMT (surface mount technology) line is already operational and trials are running in Rudrapur. For Telangana, the machinery is under import. Altogether, Micromax will have a capacity of about 30 lakh a month for mobile phones.

Manufacturing 
Micromax started manufacturing LED televisions and tablets at its factory in Rudrapur (SIDCUL), Uttarakhand, in April 2014. , Micromax was set to start a  manufacturing plant in Rajasthan's Alwar district after the signing of a Memorandum of Understanding (MoU) between the Government of Rajasthan and Bhagwati Products Ltd.

YU Televentures

The first product, to be launched under a newly floated wholly owned unit, YU Televentures, is a smartphone with operating system from US-based Cyanogen Inc. through which Micromax aims to move beyond the business of mobile phone hardware that has become more or less standardised.

Projects and Partnerships 

In November 2014, Micromax partnered with Cyanogen Inc. to provide Cyanogen-based smartphones in India, under the brand name YU.

As of 10 April 2016, Micromax announced a strategic partnership with digital payments company TranServ and major global payments technology company Visa to offer the next generation of payment solutions in India.

Endorsements
Actors Akshay Kumar and Twinkle Khanna were the first celebrities to endorse Micromax Mobiles. Hugh Jackman was the brand ambassador of Micromax and appeared in a commercial in 2013 for its first flagship smartphone, the Canvas Turbo A250, and for the Canvas 4 and Canvas Sliver 5 thereafter. In July 2013, actress Chitrangada Singh posed for the Canvas 4 smartphone in New Delhi. Vighnesh Pande endorsed Micromax Canvas Unite 4 line of smartphones in 2017.

Key awards and achievements 
Micromax was recognized as an Emerging Company of the Year by V&D 100 Awards.

In 2017, Rahul Sharma was conferred the Transformational Business Leader of the Year.

Controversies

Patent litigation

In March 2013, Ericsson sued Micromax for infringement of Ericsson's eight patents registered in India that were essential to the 2G and 3G standards. The Delhi High Court ordered Micromax to pay royalty amounts to Ericsson based on the percentages of the net selling prices of the devices incorporating 2G and 3G standards. Around the time that Ericsson filed its patent infringement suit, Micromax filed a concurrent complaint with the Competition Commission of India (CCI), alleging that Ericsson had abused its allegedly dominant position by imposing exorbitant royalties for the use of its SEPs, thus violating the Competition Act 2002. As of February 2016, the CCI had yet to issue a final determinative ruling on the basis of Micromax's allegations.

In late 2014, Delhi High Court ruled that sales of the OnePlus One smartphone are blocked in India because Cyanogen OS signed an exclusive deal to sell Micromax mobile telephones only in India, although OnePlus One had a worldwide licensing deal. This move was seen as a monopoly to stem the sales of OnePlus One and other smartphone brands. However, the High Court lifted the ban, allowing OnePlus One to be sold in India as the licensing deals with Cyanogen are different for both parties.

Stealthy installation of adware
In early 2015, a Reddit user found adware installing itself stealthily on their Micromax Canvas Fire A093 telephone without permission. The adware was also using excess telephone resources such as data, memory storage, and battery life. Further investigations by the XDA community found the advertisements were created by Adups, an AdPush company based in China.

See also
 YU Televentures

References

External links

Micromax Mobile
Electronics companies of India
Information technology companies of India
Mobile phone companies of India
Mobile phone manufacturers
Telecommunications companies of India
Multinational companies headquartered in India
Indian companies established in 2000
Electronics companies established in 2000
Telecommunications companies established in 2000
Consumer electronics brands
Indian brands
2000 establishments in Haryana